Henri Philippe de Chauvelin (1714–1770) was a French cleric and politician. He was a canon of Notre Dame de Paris and a councillor to the parlement de Paris. Known as the Abbé de Chauvelin, he was the youngest son of Germain Louis Chauvelin and thus a brother of marquis François Claude Chauvelin.

He ardently attacked the Society of Jesus and defended Jansenism, leading to his imprisonment on mont Saint-Michel in 1763. When he was released, he continued to struggle against the Jesuits and in 1761 published two works which had a major impact -Discours sur les constitutions des Jésuites and Compte rendu sur la doctrine des Jésuites. This allowed him to get the Parlement of Paris to banish the Jesuits from France.

Sources

1714 births
1770 deaths
Abbés
Jansenists
French politicians
French male writers